Gerry Embleton is a British artist, born in London. He is best known as an illustrator of military and historic subjects. He has illustrated more than 40 titles for the military publisher Osprey. He is the younger brother of illustrator Ron Embleton.

Career
Embleton began as a comic strip artist, and worked on Look and Learn and TV Century 21 in the 1960s. He created the World War II science fiction strip Phantom Patrol for Odhams Press' Swift in 1962; it was reprinted as The Ghost Patrol in Smash! in 1966.

Embleton was the first artist to work on the new Dan Dare in the revived Eagle, published by IPC Magazines in 1982. This Dan Dare was the original's eponymous great-great-grandson, taking on the mantle of space explorer. Set 200 years after the original story, the first story-arc featured the return of Dan Dare's earliest nemesis, The Mekon.

In 1983, Embleton moved to Switzerland, and later began working in children's educational illustrations and then advertising.

In 1998, he founded a company called Time Machine that works with museums all over the world, specializing in vivid displays with 3D figurines.

Gerry Embleton is a founding member of the Company of Saynt George, a living-history association. His 1995 book The Medieval Soldier, co-authored with Tolkien illustrator John Howe, had a big influence on the living-history hobby as a whole.

He lives in Prêles near Neuchâtel. He also paints landscapes.

References

External links

Time-Machine website
Reprint of "Return of the Mekon" from 1982
Stingray comic archive including Embleton's work
Look and Learn archive search
 

Living people
Year of birth missing (living people)
Artists from London
English comics artists